Coombe Hill is a  biological Site of Special Scientific Interest in Gloucestershire, notified in 1994.

The site lies within the Cotswold Area of Outstanding Natural Beauty and the Cotswold Hills Environmentally Sensitive Area. It is near Wotton-under-Edge. It is moderately steep, and mainly faces south.

Flora
The hill is a large, unimproved limestone grassland pasture area, with an ungrazed area and an edge of broadleaved woodland (along the western boundary). This site is of special notification because of its large area of flower rich grassland.  It is specifically a site for the nationally rare Limestone Woundwort (Stachy alpina).  A nearby site (Wotton Hill SSSI) supports this rare plant also.

References

SSSI Source
 Natural England SSSI information on the citation
 Natural England SSSI information on the Coombe Hill, Stroud units

External links
 Natural England (SSSI information)

Sites of Special Scientific Interest in Gloucestershire
Sites of Special Scientific Interest notified in 1994
Cotswolds
Wotton-under-Edge